General elections were held in East Africa Protectorate (modern Kenya) in March and April 1920, the first elections in the country. The Legislative Council had previously consisted entirely of appointed members. The new Council consisted of 11 elected white members, two appointed members representing the Indian population and one appointed member representing the Arab population, as well as a number of appointees by the Governor. This allowed the Council representative, although not responsible government. The territory became Kenya Colony on 23 July.

The eleven White members were elected in single-member constituencies of Nairobi North, Nairobi South, Mombasa, Coast, Lake, Rift Valley, Plateau North, Plateau South, Kenya, Ukamba and Kikuyu.

Results

References

1920 elections in Africa
1920 in Kenya
1920
East Africa Protectorate
Legislative Council of Kenya
1920
March 1920 events
April 1920 events